Jonathan Daniels may refer to:

Jonathan W. Daniels (1902–1981), White House Press Secretary
Jonathan Daniels (1939–1965), Episcopal seminarian, killed for his work in the American civil rights movement
Jon Daniels (born 1977), general manager of the American baseball club the Texas Rangers

See also
John Daniels (disambiguation)